Solvency II Directive 2009 (2009/138/EC) is a Directive in European Union law that codifies and harmonises the EU insurance regulation. Primarily this concerns the amount of capital that EU insurance companies must hold to reduce the risk of insolvency.

Following an EU Parliament vote on the Omnibus II Directive on 11 March 2014, Solvency II came into effect on 1 January 2016. This date had been previously pushed back many times.

Aims
EU insurance legislation aims to unify a single EU insurance market and enhance consumer protection. The third-generation Insurance Directives established an "EU passport" (single licence) for insurers to operate in all member states if they fulfilled EU conditions. Many member states concluded the EU minima were not enough, and took up their own reforms, which still led to differing regulations, hampering the goal of a single market.

Political implications of Solvency II

A number of the large Life Insurers in the UK are unhappy with the way the legislation has been developed. In particular, concerns have been publicly expressed over a number of years by the CEO of Prudential, the UK's largest Life Insurance company.

Doubts about the basis of the Solvency II legislation, in particular the enforcement of a market-consistent valuation approach have also been expressed by American subsidiaries of UK parents - the impact of the 'equivalency' requirements are not well understood and there is some concern that the legislation could lead to overseas subsidiaries becoming uncompetitive with local peers, resulting in the need to sell them off, potentially resulting in a 'Fortress Europe'.

Background
Since Directive 73/239/EEC was introduced in 1973, more elaborate risk management systems developed. Solvency II reflects new risk management practices to define required capital and manage risk. While the "Solvency I" Directive was aimed at revising and updating the current EU Solvency regime, Solvency II has a much wider scope. A solvency capital requirement may have the following purposes:

 To reduce the risk that an insurer would be unable to meet claims;
 To reduce the losses suffered by policyholders in the event that a firm is unable to meet all claims fully;
 To provide early warning to supervisors so that they can intervene promptly if capital falls below the required level; and
 To promote confidence in the financial stability of the insurance sector

Often called "Basel for insurers," Solvency II is somewhat similar to the banking regulations of Basel II.  For example, the proposed Solvency II framework has three main areas (pillars):

 Pillar 1 consists of the quantitative requirements (for example, the amount of capital an insurer should hold).
 Pillar 2 sets out requirements for the governance and risk management of insurers, as well as for the effective supervision of insurers.
 Pillar 3 focuses on disclosure and transparency requirements.

Contents

Title I General rules on the taking-up and pursuit of direct insurance and reinsurance activities

Chapter I Subject matter, scope and definitions
Chapter II Taking-up of business
Chapter III Supervisory authorities and general rules
Chapter IV Conditions governing business
Chapter V Pursuit of life and non-life insurance activity
Chapter VI Rules relating to the valuation of assets and liabilities, technical provisions, own funds, solvency capital requirement, minimum capital requirement and investment rules
Chapter VII Insurance and reinsurance undertakings in difficulty or in an irregular situation
Chapter VIII Right of establishment and freedom to provide services
Chapter IX Branches established within the community and belonging to insurance or reinsurance undertakings with head offices situated outside the community
Chapter X Subsidiaries of insurance and reinsurance undertakings governed by the laws of a third country and acquisitions of holdings by such undertakings

Title II Specific provisions for insurance and reinsurance

Title III Supervision of insurance and reinsurance undertakings in a group

Title IV Reorganisation and winding-up of insurance undertakings

Pillar 1
The pillar 1 framework set out qualitative and quantitative requirements for calculation of technical provisions and Solvency Capital Requirement (SCR) using either a standard formula given by the regulators or an internal model developed by the (re)insurance company. 

Technical provisions are divided on claim provisions, pertaining to earned business and premium provisions, pertaining to unearned business. Premium provisions are not equal to unearned premium reserve.

The value of technical provision should be equal to the sum of best estimate of the liabilities and risk margin. The best estimate corresponds to the probability-weighted average of future cash-flows, taking into account the time value of money. Usage of central actuarial estimate is required and no margin for prudence is allowed. Only cash-flows that are within contract boundaries are taken into consideration. Solvency II specifies exact rules for determination of these contract boundaries. 

Technical provisions represent the current amount the (re)insurance company would have to pay for an immediate transfer of its obligations to a third party.

The SCR is the capital required to ensure that the (re)insurance company will be able to meet its obligations over the next 12 months with a probability of at least 99.5%. In addition to the SCR capital a Minimum capital requirement (MCR) must be calculated which represents the threshold below which the national supervisor (regulator) would intervene. The MCR is intended to correspond to an 85% probability of adequacy over a one-year period and is bounded between 25% and 45% of the SCR.

For supervisory purposes, the SCR and MCR can be regarded as "soft" and "hard" floors respectively. That is, a regulatory ladder of intervention applies once the capital holding of the (re)insurance undertaking falls below the SCR, with the intervention becoming progressively more intense as the capital holding approaches the MCR. The Solvency II Directive provides regional supervisors with a number of discretions to address breaches of the MCR, including the withdrawal of authorization from selling new business and the winding up of the company.

Criticisms
Think-tanks such as the World Pensions & Investments Forum have argued that European legislators pushed dogmatically and naïvely for the adoption of the Basel II and Solvency II recommendations. In essence, they forced private banks, central banks, insurance companies and their regulators to rely more on assessments of credit risk by private rating agencies. Thus, part of the public regulatory authority was abdicated in favor of private rating agencies. The calibration of the standard formula for assessing equity risk has been strongly criticized by the German economist Stefan Mittnik for the fact that the procedure used for determining correlations between different asset classes gives rise to spurious (i.e., unreliable) correlations or spurious relationships.

The demanding nature of Solvency II legislation compared to current regulations has attracted criticism. According to RIMES, complying with the new legislation will impose a complex and significant burden on many European financial organizations, with 75% of firms in 2011 reporting that they were not in a position to comply with Pillar III reporting requirements.

The Matching adjustment mechanism of Solvency II has also been criticised as a form of creative accounting that hides the real value of liabilities.

See also

EU law
European company law
Own risk and solvency assessment

References

External links
Text of Solvency II
EU FAQ on Solvency II
Lloyd's of London guidance 

Capital requirement
European Union financial market policy
Insurance legislation